Kfar Aza (lit. Gaza Village) is a kibbutz in southern Israel. Located between Netivot and Sderot around five kilometres east of Gaza, it falls under the jurisdiction of Sha'ar HaNegev Regional Council.

History
The kibbutz was established in August 1951 by Jewish immigrants and refugees from Egypt and the Moroccan city of Tangier who had received training in Ein Harod, Ayelet HaShahar and later Afikim. It was temporarily abandoned in 1955, and in January 1957 members of the Mita'arim gar'in moved in.

References

External links
Official website 
Kfar Aza - Shaar Hanegev Or Movement

Kibbutzim
Kibbutz Movement
Populated places established in 1951
1951 establishments in Israel
Gaza envelope
Populated places in Southern District (Israel)
Egyptian-Jewish culture in Israel
Moroccan-Jewish culture in Israel